The Ceralvo Masonic Hall and School, in Centertown, Kentucky, was listed on the National Register of Historic Places in 2015.

The Ceralvo Masonic Hall and School was used for the education of the public, public meetings, and it was a religious facility. It was in significant use through the years of 1897-1925 when it served these purposes. After a new school had been built close to the Hall and School, its purpose has shifted to the use of a Methodist church.

The Ceralvo Masonic Hall and School replaced a building that had been built in its area but had burnt down the prior year.

It was one of 15 sites approved by the Kentucky Historic Preservation Review Board for NRHP nomination in June 2015.

References

3. 2015

Clubhouses on the National Register of Historic Places in Kentucky
Former Masonic buildings in Kentucky
National Register of Historic Places in Ohio County, Kentucky
School buildings on the National Register of Historic Places in Kentucky
Masonic educational institutions in the United States